Etoile Sportive Football Club Malley, known as Malley is a football club from Malley, Switzerland. Various club teams train in the vast arena of Blécherette, based in the north of the city. The training center also serves as the headquarters of the club.

The club was founded in 1927, is currently playing in the Swiss 1. Liga.

History 
 1927: Foundation of the club that bears the name of a district of Lausanne.
 1942: The field of Factory Gas in Malley leaves room for slaughterhouses, the club must emigrate to Renens.
 1945: The club settled permanently in the heights of the city of Lausanne and took possession of Stade du Bois-Gentil.

Grounds

Stadium 
Since moving the club in 1945, the first team of ES FC Malley LS plays in the "Stade du Bois-Gentil". With a capacity of 3,500 (including 500 seats), it has the distinction of having kept its historic grandstand origin until today.

Training Center 
The training center of the ES FC Malley LS is called the "Centre Sportif de la Blécherette". It contains seven football fields (5 in grass, 1 synthetic and 1 clay). It now matches the drive and the main club teams (except the first team). The construction of a new modern training center, just 200 meters from the present, is expected around 2016 in the project redevelopment district of Blécherette.

External links 
 Official site

Football clubs in Switzerland
Association football clubs established in 1927
1927 establishments in Switzerland